Lone fleabane is a common name for several plants and may refer to:

Erigeron cavernensis
Erigeron uncialis, native to the western United States